The Martinsville Road Covered Bridge, west of Martinsville, Ohio in Clark Township, Clinton County, Ohio, was built in 1871.  It was listed on the National Register of Historic Places in 1974.

It is a multiple kingpost covered bridge.

It was built by Zimri Wall in 1871.  Wall co-founded the Champion Bridge Company the next year, which in 1999 was one of the oldest continuously operating bridge companies in the U.S., and which considers this bridge its first work.

References

Covered bridges in Ohio
National Register of Historic Places in Clinton County, Ohio
Bridges completed in 1871